The Delphi Inscription, or Gallio Inscription (IG, VII, 1676; SIG, II, 801d), is the name given to the collection of nine fragments of a letter written by the Roman emperor Claudius c. 52 CE which was discovered early in the 20th century at the Temple of Apollo in Delphi, Greece.

Text
The reconstructed inscription begins thus:

Tiber[ius Claudius Cae]sar Augustus Ge[rmanicus, invested with tribunician po]wer [for the 12th time, acclaimed Imperator for t]he 26th time, F[ather of the Fa]ther[land...]. For a l[ong time have I been not onl]y [well-disposed towards t]he ci[ty] of Delph[i, but also solicitous for its pro]sperity, and I have always guard[ed th]e cul[t of t]he [Pythian] Apol[lo. But] now [since] it is said to be desti[tu]te of [citi]zens, as [L. Jun]ius Gallio, my fri[end] an[d procon]sul, [recently reported to me, and being desirous that Delphi] should retain [inta]ct its for[mer rank, I] ord[er you (pl.) to in]vite well-born people also from [ot]her cities [to Delphi as new inhabitants....]

The reference to proconsul Gallio in the inscription provides an important marker for developing a chronology of the life of Apostle Paul by relating it to the trial of Paul in Achaea mentioned in the Acts of the Apostles (Acts 18:12-17).

See also
 Chronology of Jesus

References

Bibliography

External links 
 
 Timeline of the Apostle Paul

1st-century inscriptions
20th-century archaeological discoveries
Greek inscriptions
Koine Greek
Inscriptions
Greece in the Roman era
Archaeological discoveries in Greece
Claudius